Donna Brown (born 15 February 1955) is a Canadian soprano opera singer.

Brown was born in Renfrew, Ontario. She began her opera career with Peter Brook's production of La Tragédie de Carmen, a work which involved two months of intensive workshops with Peter Brook, learning his method of acting based on Stanislavsky, followed by three months of performing La Tragédie de Carmen in Paris, and then touring it throughout Europe for a year with his troupe. This proved to be the best form of introduction to the opera/theatre possible, and had a strong influence on her further work in operas in the years to follow.

Soon afterwards, she was engaged by the Paris Opera to sing Aricie in the famous Pizzi production of Rameau's Hippolyte et Aricie, with William Christie conducting. She then sang such roles as Pamina from The Magic Flute Sophie from Der Rosenkavalier, Gilda from Rigoletto, Scylla from Scylla et Glaucus, Maddeleine from Le postillon de Lonjumeau Almirena from Rinaldo, Morgana from Alcina.

Concerts
In the concert scene, Brown has sung with such orchestras as London Philharmonic Orchestra, NHK Symphony Orchestra, Tokyo, Israel Philharmonic Orchestra, Orchestre de Paris, Orchestre National de France, Philadelphia Orchestra, San Francisco Symphony, Orquestra Sinfônica do Estado de São Paulo, Bavarian Radio Symphony Orchestra, Berliner Symphoniker, Orchestre de la Suisse Romande, Orchestra dell'Accademia Nazionale di Santa Cecilia. She works with such conductors as Daniel Barenboim, Bernard Haitink, Kent Nagano, Kurt Masur, Jeffrey Tate, and Charles Dutoit. Maintaining a special collaboration for over 15 years with Helmuth Rilling and John Eliot Gardiner, Brown recorded numerous CDs and DVDs with both of them.

Recital
Brown has been hailed as a remarkable interpreter of Art Song and has sung in over 100 recitals throughout the world, with such pianists as Philippe Cassard, Michel Dalberto, Stéphane Lemelin, and Roger Vignoles.

Biography
Brown has dual nationality – Canadian and French – and is married to James Zaluski.

Since 2007, Brown has been singing concerts with orchestra: Mahler's 2nd and 4th, Schubert Lieder Orchestrated, Chausson's Poème de l'amour et de la mer, Bach's "Jauchzet Gott", Britten's "Les Illuminations", and continues to sing "Gitanjali", a work written for her in 1992, by R. Murray Schafer. She also continues to sing recitals and chamber music with Qutatuor Ebène, Trio Hochelaga, Vienna Piano Trio, and numerous other individual instrumentalists in various festivals.

She sings in joint recitals with Russell Braun, and in duo with Andrew Mah, guitarist, in their newly formed Duo Brazil.

Brown is a passionate advocate for healthy vocal training and gives master classes throughout the world. She is currently a professor at the Conservatoire de Montréal and at the University of Ottawa. She was also a visiting professor at the Yonsei University in Seoul, South Korea, the Fundación Schola Cantorum, in Caracas Venezuela, and The Bachakademie in Santiago de Compostella, Spain.

Discography
 "Villa-Lobos Bachianas Brasileiras #5" Roberto Minczuk conductor. 2007. BIS
 "Haydn Nelsonmesse; Theresienmesse" Sir John Eliot Gardiner conductor. 2002. Philips
 "Mozart Coronation Mass; Exsultate Jubilate" Helmuth Rilling conductor. KV 317. 2001. Hänssler 98.395
 "Debussy Mélodies de jeunesse" Stéphane Lemelin piano. 2001. Atma ACD 2 2209
 "Berlioz Messe Solennelle" Orchestre Revolutionnaire et Romantique. Gardiner conductor. 2001. Philips 464 688-2
 "Frühlingslieder. Brahms – Liszt – Schubert – Schumann – Wolf – et al" Lemelin piano. 1998. Atma ACD 2 2165
 "Schafer The Garden of the Heart" National Arts Centre Orchestra, Mario Bernardi conductor. 1997. CBC SMCD-5173
 "Handel Agrippina. Gardiner conductor" 1997. Philips 438 009-2
 "Handel Alexander's Feast" Gardiner conductor. 1987. Philips 422-053-2
 "Schubert Mass in A-flat major" Oregon Bach Festival Orchestra. Rilling conductor. 1997. Hänssler 98.120
 "Haydn Die Schöpfung" English Baroque Soloists. Gardiner conductor. 1997. Archiv 449217
 "Bach Mass in F major, Mass in A major" Rilling conductor. 1995. Hänssler 98.924
 "Verdi Requiem/Quattro Pezzi Sacri" Orchestre Revolutionnaire et Romantique. Gardiner conductor. 1995. Philips 442 142-2
 "Debussy Rodrigue et Chimène. Lyon National Opera Orchestra. Kent Nagano conductor. 1995. Erato 4509-98508-2
 "Fanny Mendelssohn Lieder & Trio" Françoise Tillard piano. 1992. Opus 111
 "Brahms A German Requiem" Rilling conductor. 1991. Hänssler 98.966
 "Handel/Mozart Der Messias" Rilling conductor. 1991. Hänssler 98.975
 "Handel Saul" Gardiner conductor. 1991. Philips
 "Leclair Scylla et Glaucus" Gardiner conductor. 1988. Erato 2292-45277-2
 "Lully Miserere. La Chapelle Royale" Philippe Herreweghe conductor. 1985. Harmonia Mundi La Solothèque HMS 926013
 "Requiem der Versöhnung" Rilling conductor. 1995. Haenssler 98.931
 "Verdi Don Carlos" Antonio Pappano conductor. 1996 EMI 363.31
 "A Journey of Longing" 21 Brahms songs with pianist Jane Coop.2015 Skylark Music Sky1501

References

 The Canadian Encyclopedia entry for Soprano Donna Brown
 Famous Canadian Women Timeline for Donna Brown
 CBC Radio 2 Hochelaga Trio with Donna Brown
 La Scena Musicale article on Donna Brown's return from 20 years in Europe
 Ottawa Citizen article on Duo Brazil, with Donna Brown and Andrew Mah
 National Arts Centre News 2004 Donna Brown
 National Arts Centre News 2009 Donna Brown
 Agassiz Festival Chamber Music Festival 2010 featuring Donna Brown
 Music and Beyond Festival with Donna Brown July 2010

External links
 Biography of soprano Donna Brown
 Duo Brazil Website with Donna Brown

Living people
20th-century Canadian women opera singers
McGill University School of Music alumni
21st-century French women opera singers
1955 births
People from Renfrew County
Canadian sopranos
21st-century Canadian women opera singers